Academy High School is a 3A public high school located in Little River, Texas, United States. It is part of the Academy Independent School District located in southern Bell County. In 2009, the school was rated "Recognized" by the Texas Education Agency.

Athletics
The Academy Bumblebees compete in the following sports:

Baseball
Basketball
Cross Country
Football
Golf
Marching Band
Powerlifting
Softball
Tennis
Track and Field
Volleyball
Soccer

State titles
Basketball Boys 2A 2002
Softball 3A 2017
Boys Tennis-Doubles 3A 2021, Samuel and Jonathan Golovin

References

External links
 

Public high schools in Texas
High schools in Bell County, Texas